The 2022–23 Bemidji State Beavers men's ice hockey season is the 67th season of play for the program, the 23rd at the Division I level and 2nd in the Central Collegiate Hockey Association (CCHA). The Beavers represent Bemidji State University, play their home games at Sanford Center and are coached by Tom Serratore, in his 22nd season.

Season
From the start of the season, Bemidji State had to contend with the loss of its 5 top goal scorers from the previous season. Early on, the defense stepped up and played a major role in the Beavers' success. The team earned a split with then-#2 St. Cloud State and were undefeated in conference play by early November. They cooled off a little after that but were still in a good position by the end of the fall semester. The Beavers rounded out the first half of their season with a road sweep of Minnesota State and reappeared in the USA Today poll.

Unfortunately for Bemidji State, the lack of scoring punch caught up with them and the team stumbled in the second half of their season. After January 1, Bemidji scored more then 2 goals in just 4 of their 16 games. While they won all of those matches, they went 1–10–1 in the other contests and ended up slipping to 5th in the CCHA standings.

Bemidji State opened their playoff run with an abysmal performance against Northern Michigan, allowing a season-high 7 goals. With their back to the wall, the Beavers were much better in the rematch and held the Wildcats to 1 goal after 60 minutes. Again, however, the team could barely score themselves and could only force the match into overtime. Mattias Sholl managed to stop the first two shots but the third, coming just after the 1-minute mark, found the back of the net and ended the Beavers' season.

Departures

Recruiting

Roster
As of July 8, 2022.

Standings

Schedule and results

|-
!colspan=12 style=";" | Regular Season

|-
!colspan=12 style=";" |

Scoring statistics

Goaltending statistics

Rankings

Note: USCHO did not release a poll in weeks 1, 13, or 26.

References

2022-23
Bemidji State Beavers
Bemidji State Beavers
Bemidji State Beavers
Bemidji State Beavers